Eastland County is a county located in central West Texas. As of the 2020 census, its population was 17,725. The county seat is Eastland. The county was founded in 1858 and later organized in 1873. It is named for William Mosby Eastland, a soldier during the Texas Revolution and the only officer to die as a result of the "Black Bean executions" of the Mier Expedition.

Two Eastland County communities, Cisco and Ranger, have junior colleges.

Geography

Major highways
  Interstate 20
  U.S. Highway 183
  State Highway 6
  State Highway 16
  State Highway 36
  State Highway 112

Adjacent counties
 Stephens County (north)
 Palo Pinto County (northeast)
 Erath County (east)
 Comanche County (southeast)
 Brown County (south)
 Callahan County (west)
 Shackelford County (northwest)

Demographics

Note: the US Census treats Hispanic/Latino as an ethnic category. This table excludes Latinos from the racial categories and assigns them to a separate category. Hispanics/Latinos can be of any race.

As of the census of 2000,  18,297 people, 7,321 households, and 5,036 families resided in the county. The 9,547 housing units averaged . The racial makeup of the county was 91.03% White, 2.18% African American, 0.48% Native American, 0.21% Asian,  4.85% from other races, and 1.25% from two or more races. About  10.80% of the population was Hispanic or Latino of any race.

Of the 7,321 households, 27.70% had children under the age of 18 living with them, 55.40% were married couples living together, 9.50% had a female householder with no husband present, and 31.20% were not families. About 28.6% of all households were made up of individuals, and 16.20% had someone living alone who was 65 years of age or older.  The average household size was 2.39 and the average family size was 2.93.

In the county, the population was distributed as 23.20% under  18, 9.80% from 18 to 24, 22.30% from 25 to 44, 23.90% from 45 to 64, and 20.90% who were 65  or older.  The median age was 41 years. For every 100 females, there were 94.10 males.  For every 100 females age 18 and over, there were 90.60 males.

The median income for a household in the county was $26,832, and for a family was $33,562. Males had a median income of $25,598 versus $17,112 for females. The per capita income for the county was $14,870.  About 12.10% of families and 16.80% of the population were below the poverty line, including 23.10% of those under age 18 and 14.80% of those age 65 or over.

Eastland Complex fires of 2022

On March 17, 2022, a fire complex formed around  SE of Romney.
It was claimed to have been started by drought condition and is now 70% contained. The biggest fire so far is the Kidd fire, burning about 42,333 acres.

Smoke from the fires reached as far as Houston.

Education
Despite its small population, the county is home to two community colleges – Cisco College and Ranger College, located in their respective towns.

Media
Eastland County is part of the Abilene/Sweetwater/Brownwood television viewing area in west-central Texas. Local news media outlets include KRBC-TV, KTXS-TV, KXVA, and KTAB-TV. In the cities of Eastland, Ranger, and Cisco on Suddenlink Communications Cable Television service, residents can view the Dallas/Fort Worth market stations WFAA-TV and KERA-TV.

Eastland County is also served by four local newspapers: the Eastland Telegram, the Rising Star, Ranger Times, and Cisco Press.

Communities

Cities
 Cisco
 Eastland (county seat)
 Gorman
 Ranger

Towns
 Carbon
 Rising Star

Unincorporated communities
 Morton Valley
 Nimrod
 Olden
 Romney

Ghost towns
 Mangum

Politics

See also 

 National Register of Historic Places listings in Eastland County, Texas
 Recorded Texas Historic Landmarks in Eastland County
 Santa Claus Bank Robbery

References

External links
 
 
 Eastland-Callahan County Newspapers

 
1873 establishments in Texas
Populated places established in 1873